Byther Claude Earl John Smith (April 17, 1932 – September 10, 2021) was an American blues musician who worked with Muddy Waters, Howlin’ Wolf, Jimmy Reed, Otis Rush and Junior Wells.

Biography

Early life
Born in Monticello, Mississippi, United States, Smith's early music experiences revolved around gospel music. Orphaned, Smith was brought up by his uncle and aunt. In his teenage years he moved to Arizona to work on a cattle ranch and played in a country and western band on weekends. He worked in construction and local farmhands taught him to play the double bass. Around this time Smith showed an interest in boxing, so his aunt bought Smith an electric bass guitar to encourage him to follow a musical path instead.

Career
Smith migrated to Chicago in the mid-1950s with his wife, Etta Mae. In the early 1960s he began performing in clubs, learning guitar from J. B. Lenoir (his first cousin who had encouraged him to migrate), Robert Lockwood, Jr., and Hubert Sumlin. He worked regularly as rhythm guitarist for Otis Rush. During this period he recorded a number of singles with labels such as Bea & Baby, Cruise and Apex but in 1965 returned to his gospel roots with a group called the Gospel Travellers. In the 1970s he joined the house band at Theresa’s Tavern where he worked for five years, often playing with Junior Wells. In 1974 he recorded various tracks with Sunnyland Slim for Slim's later album 'She Got A Thing Goin' On'. In the late 1970s, Smith toured with the likes of Big Mama Thornton and George "Harmonica" Smith.

After years playing in clubs all over the world, a demo tape Smith recorded became the album Tell Me How You Like It, released by the Texas-based Grits record label. His next release in the United Kingdom was Addressing the Nation with the Blues for JSP Records. In 1995, Smith retired from his job at Economy Folding Box Company after twenty-five years, allowing him to focus fully on music. Smith retired from touring in 2015.

Delmark Records boss Bob Koester observed, "There's a mellowness there that is disappearing in all but B.B. King".

Byther Smith died in Chicago on September 10, 2021, aged 89.

Discography

Singles
Thanks You Mr. Kennedy / Champion Girl, EDA Records 1556 (1962)
So Unhappy / Money Tree, Be Be Records 101 (1974)
What Have I Done / Sweet Sixteen, Be Be Records 102 (1976)
Tell Me How You Like It / Come On In This House, Grits GR-4500 (1983)

Albums
Hold That Train, Delmark (1981)
Tell Me How You Like It, Grits (1983)
Big Shot Smitty, Mina Records 1002 (1984)
Gritty Soul, Mina Records LP-M1004 (1985)
Addressing The Nation With The Blues, JSP Records (1989)
Housefire, Bullseye (1991)
I'm A Mad Man, Bullseye BB 9527 (1993)
Mississippi Kid, Delmark (1996)
All Night Long, Delmark (1997)
Smitty’s Blues, Black and Tan (2001)
Throw Away The Book, Black and Tan (2004)
Blues on the Moon: Live at the Natural Rhythm Social Club, Delmark (2008)
Got No Place To Go, Fedora FCD 5034 (2008)

See also
List of Chicago blues musicians
Old Town BluesFest

References

External links
The Blue Highway
 
 

1932 births
2021 deaths
People from Monticello, Mississippi
American blues guitarists
American male guitarists
American blues singer-songwriters
Singer-songwriters from Mississippi
Guitarists from Mississippi
20th-century American guitarists
Black & Blue Records artists
JSP Records artists
African-American male songwriters
African-American guitarists
20th-century African-American male singers
21st-century African-American male singers